Symphoricarpos occidentalis, commonly called western snowberry or wolfberry, is a woody species of flowering plant in the honeysuckle family. Wolfberry is not to be confused with Lycium chinense and L. barbarum (goji), which are also known as wolfberry.

Description
Symphoricarpos occidentalis is a creeping shrub, with pink, rounded to bell-shaped flowers and spherical or bulbous shaped, white or pink-tinted fruits.

Distribution
Symphoricarpos occidentalis is native across much of Canada plus the northern and central United States as far south as Oklahoma, northeastern New Mexico, and the Texas Panhandle.

Cultivation
Western snowberry is grown for use in native plant and wildlife gardens, and as a bird food plant in habitat landscapes. It is considered to be a weed in certain situations.

References

External links
photo of herbarium specimen at Missouri Botanical Garden, collected in Missouri in 1994

occidentalis
Flora of the United States
Flora of Canada
Bird food plants
Plants described in 1833
Garden plants of North America
Drought-tolerant plants